ORMO, or the Volunteer Reserve of the Citizens' Militia, was a paramilitary organization and voluntary support brigade of the communist police force, the Citizen's Militia (MO). ORMO was founded in the Polish People's Republic in 1946, and disbanded in 1989 by the Sejm after the collapse of the communist bloc in Central and Eastern Europe.

In its heyday, ORMO had approximately 400,000–450,000 people in its reserves (at one time numbered as many as 600,000 civilian volunteers), recruited mostly from among the members of the communist Polish United Workers' Party (PZPR), farmers, workers and also a large share of members of United People's Party (ZSL), Democratic Party (SD) and other non-party opportunists ready for street action. ORMO was often involved in staging and performing unlawful arrests and street beatings of peaceful protesters (including women and journalists), such as during the public demonstrations organized by Solidarity aimed at removing the communist government of Poland.

Early history
The Ochotnicza Rezerwa Milicji Obywatelskiej, ORMO, was created on February 21, 1946, by the State National Council under the auspices of the Communist Polish Workers' Party (PPR). It was placed under the control of the Ministry of Public Security led by Stanisław Radkiewicz. The main, initial purpose of ORMO was to provide urgently needed reinforcements to the regular Army, Internal Security Corps and MO special forces, during operations against the Polish anti-communist insurgency. The new units were considerably small, made up of 30–300 men armed with rifles and submachine guns.

ORMO played a major role in the rigging of the first ever vote in postwar Poland, known as the "3 times yes" referendum. The ORMO men, armed with guns, guarded entrances to all polling stations and expelled official observers, as ordered. They did it again a year later, during the Polish legislative elections of 1947, when they drove opposition candidates out of towns by using intimidation and violence. In total, almost 100,000 functionaries across the country were deployed in order to secure the communist landslide victory in that year.

After 1947, the activities of ORMO became more general, shifting from specific political persecution of the regime's opponents, to the public at large. ORMO infiltrated factories and conducted round-ups among shop owners. They confiscated grain and meat from independent farmers, and took part in arresting them as the "enemies of the state", along with regular police. ORMO informants were placed everywhere within the nationalized industry.

Post-Stalinist period
With time, as the political situation in Poland stabilized, postwar submachine guns were replaced with concealed weapons. ORMO men did not receive monthly salaries, but were showered with regular monetary bonuses and state privileges. They were given new apartments, vouchers for cars, exclusive vacations and access to police health clinics, as well as better job placements. They were thoroughly indoctrinated and feared by the general population.

The next widely known operation by the ORMO took place during the March 1968 events, simultaneously in several major cities across Poland. On March 8 – while the regular MO watched students protests passively (partly out of respect for the autonomy of Warsaw University) – ORMO "worker-squads" stormed into the buildings armed with clubs, and performed swarm beatings of students in classrooms, along corridors and at the university halls. Similar operations followed in Kraków (March 14–20), Lublin, Gliwice, Wrocław (March 14–16), Gdańsk and Poznań, against striking students. At least 2,725 people were arrested. The success of the ORMO attack on universities in the wake of growing citizen discontent (see Polish 1970 protests) prompted the Ministry to begin massive expansion of its rank and file. By 1979, ORMO reached over 450,000 members.

The nascent Solidarity movement took communists by surprise. By mid-1981 the membership of the Trade Union reached 9.5 million,  of the working-age population of Poland. In this case, the ORMO formations weren't used against striking workers because many of its volunteers had become demoralized by public resentment. The show-of-force operations were confined only to major urban centres. The membership dropped dramatically. With the crushing of Solidarity by the introduction of martial law in 1981, all special operations were taken over by motorized police, the ZOMO, and SB MSW. Attempts at restructuring ORMO as the Party's own self-defence force (carried out by Kiszczak) failed miserably. In the following years many regional cells were closed down due to a lack of volunteers. Finally, in 1989 ORMO was officially dissolved by the Sejm.

See also
Similar formations:
State Defense Forces
Territorial Army (United Kingdom)
United States National Guard
Territorial Defense Force
People's Militias
Combat Groups of the Working Class
Workers' Militia
Patriotic Guards
Worker-Peasant Red Guards

Notes and references

External links

Polish People's Republic
1946 establishments in Poland
1989 disestablishments in Poland